The Battle of Fair Oaks & Darbytown Road (also known as the Second Battle of Fair Oaks) was fought October 27–28, 1864 in Henrico County, Virginia, as part of the Richmond-Petersburg Campaign of the American Civil War.

In combination with movements against the Boydton Plank Road at Petersburg, Maj. Gen. Benjamin Butler attacked the Richmond defenses along Darbytown Road with the X Corps. The XVIII Corps marched north to Fair Oaks where it was soundly repulsed by Maj. Gen. Charles W. Field's Confederate division. Confederate forces counterattacked, taking some 600 prisoners. The Richmond defenses remained intact. Of Lt. Gen. Ulysses S. Grant's offensives north of the James River, this was repulsed most easily. The Medal of Honor was awarded to First Lieutenant William Rufus Shafter for his actions. Union casualties were 1,603, Confederates fewer than 100.

Background

Union
The following Union Army units and commanders fought in the Battle of Fair Oaks & Darbytown Road. It is compiled from the official tabulation of casualties, so includes only units which sustained casualties.

Army of the James

MG Benjamin F. Butler

X Corps

BG Alfred H. Terry

XVIII Corps

MG Godfrey Weitzel

Confederate
The following Confederate army units and commanders fought at the battle.

Army of Northern Virginia

First Corps
LTG James Longstreet

Fourth Corps

Cavalry Corps

Abbreviations used

Military rank
 Gen = General
 LTG = Lieutenant General
 MG = Major General
 BG = Brigadier General
 Col = Colonel
 Ltc = Lieutenant Colonel
 Maj = Major

Other
 (w) = wounded
 (mw) = mortally wounded
 (k) = killed in action
 (c) = captured

Battle

Notes

References
  National Park Service battle description
 Salmon, John S. The Official Virginia Civil War Battlefield Guide. Mechanicsburg, PA: Stackpole Books, 2001. .
 CWSAC Report Update

 

Petersburg Campaign
Battles of the Eastern Theater of the American Civil War
Confederate victories of the American Civil War
Fair Oaks and Darbytown Road
Battle of Fair Oaks and Darbytown Road
Conflicts in 1864
1864 in Virginia
October 1864 events
American Civil War orders of battle